Soar or SOAR may refer to:

Acronyms
Safe operating area ratings in electronics
160th Special Operations Aviation Regiment (Airborne), US Army regiment
Security Orchestration, Automation, and Response, a set of applications that collect data from disparate sources and automatically respond to security events
Southern Astrophysical Research Telescope, optical and near-infrared telescope located on Cerro Pachón, Chile
Special Operations Assault Rifle, primary assault rifle for the special forces unit of the Philippine National Police
Student orientation and Registration
Surgical Outcomes Analysis and Research, a research collaborative in the Beth Israel Deaconess Medical Center

Geography

Scotland
Intu Braehead Soar, a shopping centre in Braehead, Renfrewshire

England
River Soar, a river in Leicestershire/Midlands England
Soar, South Hams, a settlement in South Hams
Old Soar Manor, an English Heritage property near Plaxtol, Kent

Wales
Soar, Anglesey
Soar, Gwynedd
Soar, Ceredigion, location of chapel near Llangynfelyn
Soar, Powys, former village

Chapels
Soar Chapel, Cwmaman, Rhondda Cynon Taf
Soar Chapel, Hirwaun, Rhondda Cynon Taf
Soar Chapel, Llanelli, Carmarthenshire
Soar Chapel, Llwydcoed, Rhondda Cynon Taf
Soar y mynydd, Llanddewi Brefi, Ceredigion
Canolfan Soar (arts centre in a former chapel), Merthyr Tydfil

Music
"Soar", a song by Christina Aguilera from the album Stripped (2002)
Soar (album), 1991 by the American band Samiam
Soar (Mari Hamada album), 2023
S.O.A.R. (Devour The Day album), 2016 album by Devour The Day

Other uses
Soar (cognitive architecture), a symbolic cognitive architecture
SOAR (spaceplane), air-space system under development for launch of satellites and suborbital space tourism from Swiss Space Systems company, Switzerland

See also
Soaring (disambiguation)
Soares, a surname
Șoarș, a commune in Brașov County, Romania
Zoar (disambiguation), of which Soar is the Welsh spelling